Southern Suburbs was an Australian soccer club from Clayton, Victoria, a suburb of Melbourne, Victoria. The club was formed in 1979 as Oakleigh Suburbs by local Greek Australians. The club then changed their name to South Caulfield in 1992, and finally to Southern Suburbs in 2004. In December 2010, Southern Suburbs merged with Box Hill United to form Box Hill United Pythagoras.

History
The club was formed in 1979 by members of the PanSamian Youth club and competed in the District League (now the Victorian Amateur League). The club was known as Murrumbeena Pythagoras Soccer Club. The club chose the name Pythagoras after the famous mathematician who was born in Samos, Greece. The club's first coach was Manos Milios (well known coach and journalist).

The following year, the club changed its name to Oakleigh United; however this was to only last a few years before the club became known as Burwood United. In 1984, the club was promoted to Provisional 3.

Another name change followed in 1986 as did the move to Keeley Park in Clayton South (current home). The club was now called Oakleigh Suburbs and under this name the club went on to achieve multiple promotions in its so-called "golden era". The club achieved promotion for five years in a row from 1987 to 1991. In 1991 the club was crowned champions of State League 3 under the coaching of Tony Gatzonis and were promoted to State 2 for the 1992 season. Paul Tzintzis was the top scorer in the 1991 championship winning team with 12 goals while George Pashalakis was the long time Team Manager.

The club's Keeley Park ground was however not of a sufficient standard to compete at this level and the club was forced to rent Caulfield City's Princess Park ground in order to be allowed to compete in State 2. The club maintained Keeley Park as its training and junior's venue however changed its name to South Caulfield to reflect the location of the new senior ground. After a slow start in 1992 the club followed up with solid performances in 1993 & 1994 and even had former Socceroo & South Melbourne star Con Boutsianis on loan for half a season. George Varayiannis was the President from 1988–1996. It was also in the early mid 1990s that goalkeeper Peter Zois played before the club before going overseas to the Netherlands. Another players to make his mark in the early 1990s was 1993 and 1995 club top scorer Carlos Romero who was signed from Mordialloc.

The club was relegated in 1994 despite finishing seventh as it was no longer able to use Caulfield City's ground and had to find a new ground that was again suitable for State 2 competition. A proposed deal with another State 2 club (that had already been relegated) was aborted at the last minute by that club leaving Pythagoras to be relegated and the other club being reinstated to State 2. It was a bitter pill for Pythagoras to swallow as it was demoted back to play in the State 3 competition. After a couple of solid seasons in State 3 during the mid 1990s the club was eventually relegated in 1997 and competed in State 4 during 1998. Unfortunately the club was now on a downward spiral and was also relegated in 1998 and also 1999 ending up in Provisional 2 for season 2000. Club presidents from 1997–1999 were Con Tripodis and Xen Kariatoglos.

The club was on the verge of folding prior to the 2000 season however new club President Paul Mota contributed the necessary funds to purchase new playing strips and pay for player registrations to keep the club afloat. Unfortunately the club continued to struggle on the field and would have been relegated again had it not been for a restructure in the Provisional Leagues to form regional splits (i.e. N/W & S/E).

The club was still in dire straits prior to the beginning of Season 2001 with barely enough players to field a Senior & Reserve team and with only 2 points at the halfway mark of the season looked all but doomed to relegation. It was at this point that the club began the long road back with a turnaround to save itself from relegation finishing the season on 20 points and in 9th place. Tony Amato was the club's top scorer that year with 8 goals whilst the coach was Theo Karapanagiotidis. A new young committee was also formed during the season to assist club stalwart Xenophon Kariatoglos. Alex Palmos took over as president with Tony Amato, John Nickas, Karl Froehlich, Jim Apokis and Paul Mota on board as the club began its journey to return to the State leagues and to restore itself to its former highs.

From this point the club began to grow and formed its first girls' team in 2002 while the senior team had its best year in more than 10 years. The club also formed a Thirds team in 2002. The following year a second girls' team was added.

The club changed its name to Southern Suburbs SC in 2004 combining the two previous names of Oakleigh Suburbs and South Caulfield. This was seen as a name that would stand the test of time in the event of any future ground relocations. The club appointed a new coach in George Botakis and the senior team achieved promotion to Provisional 1 immediately after finishing 3rd. The John Salatas coached Reserve team also won the championship after finishing the season undefeated. The girls' team also won the State 2 title and was promoted to State 1 with Tina Moutafis scoring 52 goals for the season.

In 2005 the Senior team consolidated in its first season in Provisional 1 by finishing 5th while the club's second girls’ team won the State 4 championship.

In 2006 the club received a $150,000 upgrade to the Keeley Park Clubrooms from the Kingston Council and the club also started its junior program with 25 kids aged 5–10 taking part in GoalKick. The Senior team won a club record 7 games in a row at the start of the 2006 season before fading at the end of the season to finish 3rd after being in the "top 2" positions for 20 or the 22 rounds. Despite finishing third, the club was promoted to the State 3 competition for season 2007 after a vacancy became available.

The club began the 2007 season with a new Senior coach in Michael Tapai and back playing in State 3 after a 10-year absence. The club consolidated with two top-half finishes in its first two seasons in State 3.

Arthur Georgiou was appointed as the new senior coach for season 2009 and the club won promotion to State league 2 SE after finishing runners-up. After years of lobbying the club also switched on its new floodlights for its training pitch at Keeley Park in July 2009 with funding from the Kingston Council. The club also relaunched their Junior programme with an Under 8's Small Sided Football program.

In December 2010, Southern Suburbs merged with Box Hill United to form Box Hill United Pythagoras.

References

External links
 OzFootball Southern Suburbs Page
 Football Federation Victoria Official website
 Southern Suburbs website

Association football clubs established in 1979
Soccer clubs in Melbourne
Victorian State League teams
Greek-Australian culture in Melbourne
1979 establishments in Australia
Sport in the City of Monash
Association football clubs disestablished in 2010
2010 disestablishments in Australia